Quebec is a 1951 American historical drama film directed by George Templeton and written by Alan Le May. Set in 1837, it stars John Drew Barrymore in a fictional account of the Patriotes Rebellion. The popular uprising in Lower Canada, now Quebec, sought Democratic reforms, and happened around the same time as a similar revolt in Upper Canada, now Ontario.

Plot 
The film tells the tale of Mme. Stephanie Durossac, also known as Lafleur (played by Corinne Calvet), a fiery pro-independence leader, and Mark Douglas (Barrymore), a young man who discovers that Lafleur is his long-lost mother he believed to be deceased. The actions of Lafleur create problems since she is also the wife of the British governor of the province. Lafleur ultimately sacrifices herself to prevent Douglas from being taken hostage. The climax of the movie depicts a military assault on the British fortress.

Cast 
John Drew Barrymore as Mark Douglas [credited as John Barrymore, Jr.]
Corinne Calvet as Mademoiselle Stephanie Durossac / Lafleur 
Barbara Rush as Madelon 
Patric Knowles as Charles Douglas 
John Hoyt as Father Antoine

Production 
The film was actually shot on location in Quebec, in the fashion typical of post-war Hollywood. It captured therefore local sights like the Citadelle of Quebec City, Montmorency Falls and the Quebec countryside. It also cast local actors. Quebec also features Patsy Ruth Miller, a former silent-screen star making her first screen appearance since 1931.

Comic book adaption
 Eastern Color Movie Love #8 (April 1951)

See also 
Quebec nationalism
Quebec independence movement
History of Quebec
Timeline of Quebec history
Patriote movement

References

External links
 

1951 films
1950s historical drama films
American historical drama films
1950s English-language films
Lower Canada Rebellion war films
Paramount Pictures films
Films adapted into comics
1951 drama films
1950s American films
1950s Canadian films